Garm-e Tamam Deh (also Romanized as Garm-e Tamām Deh and Garm Tamām Deh; also known as Garm) is a village in Bandan Rural District, in the Central District of Nehbandan County, South Khorasan Province, Iran. At the 2006 census, its population was 137, in 33 families.

References 

Populated places in Nehbandan County